= Huntenkunst =

Annual art event in the Netherlands

Huntenkunst is an annually recurring international art event held in the Dutch town of Doetinchem in May. At the event, artists present modern visual art, diverse in styles and techniques, from photography to painting and sculpture to video art. The art event is well known for its quality, variation and attendance of large numbers of artists from many different countries.
